Destiny and Power: The American Odyssey of George Herbert Walker Bush is a 2015 book by Jon Meacham about George H. W. Bush.

Critical reception
The New York Times wrote that the book "reflects the qualities of both subject and biographer: judicious, balanced, deliberative, with a deep appreciation of history and the personalities who shape it." Kirkus Reviews called it "meticulously researched but perhaps overlong," writing that "Meacham does his best with this 'underwhelming' but noble subject." Publishers Weekly called Destiny and Power "a vivid, well-written account that doesn't quite come to grips with its subject's pivotal place in history."

References

External links
Discussion with Jon Meacham and George W. Bush on the life of George H.W. Bush, November 8, 2015, C-SPAN
Presentation by Meacham on Destiny and Power at the Miami Book Fair, November 21, 2015, C-SPAN
Presentation by Meacham on Destiny and Power at the National Book Festival, September 24, 2016, C-SPAN

2015 non-fiction books
Books about George H. W. Bush
American biographies
Biographies about politicians
Random House books
English-language books